Hiilawe Waterfall (or Hi'ilawe Waterfall) is one of the tallest and most powerful waterfalls in Hawaii located on the Big Island. The waterfall drops about 1,450 feet (442m) with a main drop of 1,201 feet (366m), into Waipio Valley on Lalakea Stream.  Lalakea Stream above the falls has been diverted for irrigation purposes so the falls can be dry even during the wet spring in March.

Notes

Waterfalls of Hawaii (island)